Fine Living (Sometimes called Fine Living Network or FLN) was a European television channel, initially owned and operated by Scripps Networks Interactive and later by Discovery Inc., from 2018 onwards. It featured documentaries, reality, and how-to shows related to home, cooking, travel, lifestyle and health.

History
The channel was operated by Scripps Networks Interactive in a joint venture with Chello Zone from the launch till 2018 when Discovery, Inc. acquired Scripps Networks Interactive.

Fine Living HD launched in Europe on 1 September 2015.

Fine Living ceased broadcasting in the Netherlands and Flanders on 31 January 2019. Content from former Scripps television channels Travel Channel, Fine Living and Food Network has been integrated into the programming of Discovery, TLC and Investigation Discovery in the Benelux.

On 31 December 2020, it was announced that the television channel has been dissolved following a bankruptcy proceeding due to accumulated debt of over €30 million, and was replaced by the pan-European version of HGTV.

Programming
Programs on Fine Living were of factual entertainment and originated from the categories of Design & Décor, Food & Drink and Travel & Adventure, and dedicated to inspiring and empowering people to live better and maximize their time.

All TV shows

 10 Grand in Your Hand
 Adam Richman's Best Sandwich in America
 Amazing Water Homes
 America's Most Desperate Kitchens
 Beachfront Bargain Hunt
 Brian Boitano Project
 Brian Boitano's Italian Adventure
 Candice Tells All
 Caribbean Life
 Color Splash
 Cool Pools
 Cousins on Call
 Curb Appeal
 Daryl's Restoration Over-Hall
 Dear Genevieve
 Desperate Landscapes
 Diners, Drive-Ins and Dives
 Drop 5 lbs with Good Housekeeping
 Extreme Homes
 Fixer Upper
 Flea Market Flip
 Flip or Flop
 Giada at Home
 Giada Entertains
 Giada in Paradise
 Giada's Weekend Getaways
 Going Yard
 Hawaii Life
 Healthy Appetite with Ellie Krieger
 Healthy Gourmet
 High Low Project
 House Hunters
 The Insider's List
 Island Life
 The Jennie Garth Project
 Junk Gypsies
 Kitchen Cousins (John Colaneri & Anthony Carrino)
 Kitchen Impossible
 Million Dollar Closets
 Million Dollar Rooms
 Model: NYC
 Mom Caves
 My First Renovation
 Platinum Weddings
 Rehab Addict
 Restoration SOS Virginia
 Selling LA
 Texas Flip N Move

See also
Fine Living Network
Fine Living (Italian TV channel)

References

Fine Living Network
Warner Bros. Discovery networks
Defunct television channels in the Netherlands
Defunct television channels in Portugal
Former E. W. Scripps Company subsidiaries
Television channels in North Macedonia
Television channels and stations established in 2010
Television channels and stations disestablished in 2020